Vice-Admiral Sir Peter Denis, 1st Baronet (1713 – 11 June 1778) was an English naval officer and Member of Parliament.

Life
The son of a Huguenot refugee, Denis was educated at The King's School, Chester and joined the navy as a young man. He was a midshipman in HMS Centurion under the command of Commodore George Anson at the start of his famous circumnavigation (1740–1744). He was promoted to lieutenant in 1739. On 5 November 1741, in the South Seas, he was sent in command of 16 men in a cutter to pursue a Spanish vessel . He boarded and carried his prize, which proved to be bound from Guayaquil to Callao. The cargo was of little value to its captors, but intelligence derived from the capture led to the attack on the town of Paita a few days afterwards.

By 1745 Denis had been promoted to command and given the 26-gun sixth rate . By 1747 Denis was back in the 50-gun Centurion as her captain, commanding her at the Battle of Cape Finisterre, where he once more served under Anson, now an admiral. When the enemy was sighted, Anson signalled a general chase as he expected the French to evade action if possible until they could escape under cover of darkness; Centurion was swiftest into action, engaging the rearmost French ship and occupying her and two larger enemy ships until the main body of the British fleet could come up. After the battle Denis was entrusted with bringing back to England the news of Anson's victory; as the public acclaim that followed won Anson a peerage, this may well have further endeared Denis to Anson.

In 1754, Denis entered Parliament as member for Hedon, a Yorkshire borough where Anson was the "patron" with the power to select the MPs. He held the seat for fourteen years, throughout which time the other MP was another naval officer, Sir Charles Saunders, who later rose to become First Lord of the Admiralty.

Denis continued his naval career, commanding the 90-gun  in Admiral Edward Hawke's unsuccessful expedition against Rochefort in September 1757. At the action of 29 April 1758, he was captain of the 70-gun  which defeated and captured French ship of the line Raisonnable  in the Bay of Biscay. Dorsetshire was with the fleet at the decisive victory of Quiberon Bay in 1759. In 1767 he was created a baronet, of St Mary's in the County of Kent, but as he left no male heir the title became extinct on his death.

Denis became Commander-in-Chief, The Nore, based on the River Medway in 1771 with his flag in the third-rate .

He died in 1778, having reached the rank of Vice-Admiral of the Red.

References

External links
 
 Dictionary of National Biography
 Ships of the 18th-century Royal Navy

|-

1713 births
1778 deaths
Royal Navy vice admirals
Royal Navy personnel of the War of the Austrian Succession
Royal Navy personnel of the Seven Years' War
Baronets in the Baronetage of Great Britain
Members of the Parliament of Great Britain for English constituencies
British MPs 1754–1761
British MPs 1761–1768
People educated at The King's School, Chester